is a Japanese anime television series. It is about a group of caped, crime-fighting takoyaki men. It was produced by Pierrot and broadcast for 77 episodes on TV Tokyo from April 1998 to September 1999. The anime was based on a series of children's picture books published in the 1990s.

Characters

Takoyaki Mantomen

Supporting

Antagonists

References

External links
 Official website
 

1998 anime television series debuts
1990s children's books
Japanese children's animated superhero television series
Pierrot (company)
TV Tokyo original programming
Series of children's books
Japanese picture books
Japanese books